Jeanne Crépeau (born 1961 in Montreal, Quebec) is a Canadian film director and screenwriter from Montreal, Quebec, best known for her film Julie and Me (Revoir Julie).

Trained at the National Film Board of Canada and the Canadian Film Centre, she made a number of short films in the 1980s and early 1990s. Her 1989 short film Justine's Film (Le film de Justine) screened at the 1989 Toronto International Film Festival, where it received an honorable mention from the Best Canadian Short Film award jury, and at the 1990 Yorkton Short Film and Video Festival, where it won awards for Best Experimental Film, Best Director and Best Musical Score. In 1991, she collaborated with the dance troupe Brouhaha Danse on Claire, a video and performance tribute to dancer Claire Samson following her murder in 1990.

She had initially planned to make her debut feature film about an Olympic swimmer, but had difficulty securing funding; after visiting a friend in the Eastern Townships of Quebec, she rewrote the film's script and rented her friend's house for two months to serve as the film's set. Revoir Julie was released in 1998, and won the Audience Award at the Paris Lesbian Film Festival in 1999.

Films
By Attrition (L'Usure) - 1986
The Flu (Gerçure) - 1988
Justine's Film (Le film de Justine) - 1989
La Tranchée - 1991
Claire (Claire et l'obscurité) - 1991
Julie and Me (Revoir Julie) - 1998
Lonesome Monsieur Turgeon (La solitude de Monsieur Turgeon) - 2001
La beauté du geste - 2004
Jouer Ponette - 2007
Suivre Catherine - 2008
A Montreal Girl (La fille de Montréal) - 2010

See also
 List of female film and television directors
 List of lesbian filmmakers
 List of LGBT-related films directed by women

References

External links

1961 births
Living people
20th-century Canadian screenwriters
20th-century Canadian women writers
21st-century Canadian screenwriters
21st-century Canadian women writers
Canadian screenwriters in French
Canadian women film directors
Canadian women screenwriters
Canadian lesbian writers
LGBT film directors
Canadian LGBT screenwriters
Film directors from Montreal
Writers from Montreal
Canadian Film Centre alumni
Lesbian screenwriters
21st-century Canadian LGBT people
20th-century Canadian LGBT people